Bobby Vinton's Greatest Hits of Love is a third collection of Vinton's singles that were hits from 1967 to 1969. The album also includes two album tracks and two unreleased songs.

Track listing

Personnel
Billy Sherrill - producer, arranger ("Take Good Care of My Baby")
Bill McElhiney - arranger ("To Know You Is to Love You", "The Days of Sand and Shovels" and "I Love How You Love Me")
Tom Sparkman - engineer

Charts

1969 greatest hits albums
Bobby Vinton compilation albums
Albums produced by Billy Sherrill
Epic Records compilation albums